Antje Lezius (born 30 June 1960) is a German politician. Born in Kusel, Rhineland-Palatinate, she represents the CDU. Antje Lezius has served as a member of the Bundestag from the state of Rhineland-Palatinate from 2013 to 2021.

Life 
She became member of the bundestag after the 2013 German federal election. She is a member of the Committee for Labour and Social Affairs.

References

External links 

  
 Bundestag biography 

1960 births
Living people
Members of the Bundestag for Rhineland-Palatinate
Female members of the Bundestag
21st-century German women politicians
Members of the Bundestag 2017–2021
Members of the Bundestag 2013–2017
Members of the Bundestag for the Christian Democratic Union of Germany